Biglarabad (also Romanized as Bīglarābād; also known as Beglarābād) is a village in Godeh Rural District, in the Central District of Bastak County, Hormozgan Province, Iran. At the 2006 census, its population was 83, in 18 families.

References 

Populated places in Bastak County